Frances Frei is a Professor of Technology and Operations Management and the course lead for first-year diversity and inclusion studies at Harvard Business School. Her research investigates how leaders create the conditions for organizations and individuals to thrive by designing for excellence in strategy, operations, and culture. She regularly advises senior executives embarking on large-scale change initiatives and organizational transformation, including embracing diversity and inclusion as a lever for improved performance.

Early life
Frances X. Frei graduated from the University of Pennsylvania, where she earned a bachelor's degree in mathematics. She subsequently earned a master's degree in industrial engineering from Pennsylvania State University, and a PhD in Operations and Information Management from the Wharton School of the University of Pennsylvania.

Career
Frances Frei is a Professor of Technology and Operations Management at Harvard Business School. Her research investigates how leaders create the conditions for organizations and individuals to thrive by designing for excellence in strategy, operations, and culture. She regularly advises senior executives embarking on large-scale change initiatives and organizational transformation, including embracing diversity and inclusion as a lever for improved performance.

Frei is exclusively represented for speaking engagements by United Talent Agency. Topics include communication, corporate culture, corporate social responsibility, crisis management, diversity and inclusion in business, gender equality, HR effectiveness, leadership, and LGBTQIA.

Frei joined Uber in June 2017, where she was appointed as senior vice-president for leadership and strategy of leadership. She helped improve the company culture by encouraging teamwork. Frei stepped down as senior vice-president in February 2018 to develop an executive education program focused on women and underrepresented minorities, although she has stayed on in an advisory role.

Frei gave a talk at the TED conference in 2018 on the topic of building trust.

Frei was hired as a senior adviser to Riot Games in September 2018 to help with implementation of their "Culture and Diversity & Inclusion Initiative", following a published report outlining many former and current employees there asserting of sexual discrimination within the workplace.

Personal life
Frei is married to Anne Morriss. She has two sons.

Works
 
Frei, Frances; Morriss, Anne (2020). Unleashed: The Unapologetic Leader's Guide to Empowering Everyone Around You. Cambridge, Massachusetts: Harvard Business Review Press.

External links
TED talk 2018, How to build (and rebuild) trust.
 TED Interview 2019, A radical new theory on how we experience reality.

References

Living people
Wharton School of the University of Pennsylvania alumni
Harvard Business School faculty
American women academics
American women in business
Uber people
Lesbian academics
Year of birth missing (living people)
21st-century American women